Levitt Bernstein is an architecture, landscape architecture and urban design practice established in 1968 by David Levitt and David Bernstein with studios in London and Manchester. Levitt Bernstein's long-standing commitment to housing and urban design is balanced by many projects in the arts, education and cultural sectors, as well as health, offices, retail and community-based schemes.

Selected projects

The practice has undertaken the following projects:

 1976 & 1998 — Royal Exchange Theatre, Manchester
 1997 — Ikon Gallery, Birmingham
 1999 — Colston Hall, Bristol
 1998 — Victoria Hall, Stoke-on-Trent
 2001 — Stratford Circus, London
 2003 — LSO St Luke's, London
 2004 — YMCA Indian Student Hostel, London
 2006 — The Brunswick Centre, London
 2007 — Toynbee Studios, London
 2007 — Theatre Royal Bury St Edmunds
 2007 — James Lighthill House, University College, London
 2008 — Victoria Gallery & Museum, University of Liverpool
 2008 — Ramsay Hall, University College London
 2009 — Granville New Homes, London
 2009 — Bolanachi Building, Bermondsey Spa, London
 2010 — Heating Infrastructure Project (HIP), University of Liverpool
 2010 — Greengate House, London
 2011 — Central House, University College London
 2011 — Queensbridge Quarter, London
 2011 — Aylesbury Estate South West Corner, London
 2011 — Harvey Court (refurbishment and modernisation), Gonville and Caius College, Cambridge
 2013 — Papermill Place, Walthamstow, London
 2013 — John Dodgson House, University College London
 2014 — VIVO, Ocean Estate, Tower Hamlets, London
 2014 — So Stepney, Ocean Estate, Tower Hamlets, London

Awards
The firm has won a number of awards, including:

 RIBA Architectural Awards
 Civic Trust Awards
 Housing Design Awards
 London Planning Awards
 Regeneration and Renewal Awards
 Housebuilder Awards
 Affordable Home Ownership Awards
 Constructing Excellence Awards
 First Time Buyer Awards
 British Construction Industry Awards

References

Further reading 
 Housing our Ageing Population: Panel for Innovation (HAPPI) (Published by: HCA, CLG and Dept. of Health: 2009). This report was commissioned by the Homes and Communities Agency on behalf of Communities and Local Government and the Department of Health to consider how best to address the challenge of providing homes that meet the needs and aspirations of the older people of the future. The work builds on Lifetime Homes: Lifetime Neighbourhoods: a national strategy for housing in an ageing society. A 13-member panel was supported by Levitt Bernstein and PTEa, working with Design for Homes.
 Recommendations for living at Superdensity (Published by Design for Homes, 2007: Working in collaboration with three other architectural practices (HTA, PRP and PTE Architects), Levitt Bernstein prepared a design guide tackling the challenges of living at densities higher than 150 dwellings per hectare.
 David Levitt (September 2009), Housing Design Handbook, Routledge. .
 Higher Density Housing for Families: A Design and Specification Guide (Published by London Housing Federation, 2004): A guide developed by Helen Cope and Levitt Bernstein, with cost advisors Walker Management. The guide, which starts with a matrix of recommendations for different housing typologies, concentrates on responsible design and specification to ensure that higher density housing for families is developed in a way that maximises the advantages and avoids the pitfalls.
 HCA Research, Dwelling space calculator and generic plans for affordable housing(2008): Levitt Bernstein developed a simple space standards calculator to generate the minimum dwelling floor areas which would comfortably meet the current range of standards for affordable housing.

External links 
 

Design companies established in 1968
Architecture firms of England
Companies based in the London Borough of Islington
1968 establishments in England